Tumbafrailes (literally: Friar-Kicker) is a short river in Spain.

Rivers of Spain
Rivers of Castile and León